X.O. Experience is the fourth studio album by American hip hop group Tha Alkaholiks. It was released on July 10, 2001 via Loud Records. Recording sessions took place at Soundcastle and Skip Saylor Recording in California, at The Hit Factory in New York, at Mastersound Studio in Virginia Beach, and at Mirror Image Studios in Dix Hills. Production was handled by member E-Swift, as well as Rockwilder, DJ Scratch, DJ Twinz, Thayod Ausar and The Neptunes. It features guest appearances from Xzibit, Busta Rhymes, Butch Cassidy, Defari, King Tee, Kurupt and Shae Fiol. The album reached number 47 on the Billboard 200 and number 14 on the Top R&B/Hip-Hop Albums in the United States. Its lead single "Best U Can" became a minor hit in 2001, peaking at No. 64 on the Billboard Hot R&B/Hip-Hop Songs and No. 14 on the Hot Rap Songs. The album's cover art is an homage to The Jimi Hendrix Experience's 1967 album Are You Experienced.

Track listing

Personnel

Rico "Tash" Smith – vocals, executive producer, A&R
James "J-Ro" Robinson – vocals, executive producer, A&R
Eric "E-Swift" Brooks – vocals, producer (tracks: 2, 4, 7, 10, 12, 14, 15, 17, 19), executive producer, A&R
Alvin "Xzibit" Joiner – vocals (tracks: 2, 18)
Shae Geever – vocals (track 3)
Olan "Mr. Tan" Thompson – backing vocals (track 4)
Trevor "Busta Rhymes" Smith – vocals (track 6)
Duane "Defari" Johnson – vocals (track 7)
Danny "Butch Cassidy" Means – vocals (track 11)
Stanley "Stan The Guitar Man" Jones – guitar (track 15)
Roger "King Tee" McBride – vocals (track 17)
Kurt "DJ Revolution" Hoffman – scratches (track 17)
Ricardo "Kurupt" Brown – vocals (track 19)
Dana "Rockwilder" Stinson – producer (tracks: 3, 11)
George "DJ Scratch" Spivey – producer (track 6)
Eric "Thayod Ausar" Banks – producer (track 9)
Pharrell Williams – producer (track 13)
Chad Hugo – producer (track 13)
Raymond Grant – producer (track 18)
Richard Grant – producer (track 18)
Danny Romero – recording (tracks: 2, 4, 7, 10-12, 19), mixing (track 2)
Eric "Skip" Saylor – recording (tracks: 2, 4, 19)
Lance Pierre – recording (tracks: 3, 7, 9, 17)
Brian Stanley – recording (track 6)
Dave Hummel – recording (track 13)
Troy Hightower – recording (track 18), mixing (tracks: 3, 11)
Doug Wilson – mixing (tracks: 4, 6, 7, 9, 10, 12, 15, 17-19)
Ken "Duro" Ifill – mixing (track 13)
Jason Clark – art direction, design, layout
David Bett – art direction
Daniel Hastings – photography
Shane Mooney – A&R
Trakelle Frazier – A&R
Racquel Boothe – A&R
Michael Cirelli – A&R
Lynn Nantana – management
Mike "Boogie" Robertson – management
Liz Hausle – product management
William Berrol – legal
Anthony Andrews – tour/road management

Charts

References

External links

2001 albums
Loud Records albums
Tha Alkaholiks albums
Columbia Records albums
Albums produced by DJ Scratch
Albums produced by Rockwilder
Albums produced by the Neptunes